Mohammadabad (also Romanized as Moḩammadābād; also known as Maḩmūdābād and Muhammadābād) is a village in Rayen Rural District, Rayen District, Kerman County, Kerman Province, Iran. At the 2006 census, its population was 8, in 4 families.

References 

Populated places in Kerman County